Dutton is a ghost town in New Salem Township, Pike County, in the U.S. state of Illinois.

The town derived its name from David Dutton, a county official.

References

Geography of Pike County, Illinois
Ghost towns in Illinois